Richard C. Waites, J.D., Ph.D., (October 7, 1951-April 25, 2016), a noted board certified trial attorney and social psychologist, is an internationally recognized expert in jury and courtroom decision maker research, a field he helped to develop and that he continues to advance.

Waites is the author of three books and a number of comprehensive articles on law and psychology topics, including a well known courtroom psychology treatise entitled Courtroom Psychology and Trial Advocacy. published by American Lawyer Media.

Between 1973 and 2002, Waites studied, conducted research, and/or practiced as a board certified trial attorney and social psychologist during which time he reviewed thousands of peer reviewed scientific research studies and learned how best to integrate applicable findings into the process of understanding the decision-making processes of judges, jurors, and arbitrators.

Along with this understanding, Waites continually experimented and developed techniques and methods of enhancing the persuasive power of courtroom arguments in presentations. His research and practice included elements of social psychology, experimental psychology, developmental psychology, communications, organizational psychology, and other applied fields of psychology.

Jury research

One of the specific applications of experimental psychology is in the study of the decision making processes of individual jurors and jury groups in the courtrooms of federal and state courts in the United States.  Using quantitative and qualitative social science research techniques, Waites has helped to advance the use of reliable and useful testing techniques in accurately determining the most likely perceptions of jurors to further knowledge of jury decision making in specific litigation matters while at the same time improving the quality of courtroom presentations by trial advocates for the benefit of juries and trial courts.

Waites' work in this highly specialized field is notable for many reasons.  His approach to the design and implementation of jury research techniques and development of persuasive courtroom presentations is governed by his achievements as an experienced trial attorney and an experienced doctoral level social scientist.

Publications
Between 1982 and 2003, he published many of his research findings and discoveries of advanced trial advocacy techniques designed to enhance the effectiveness of courtroom presentations to judges, juries, and arbitration panels. During this time, many books, professional papers, and articles written by Waites appeared in publications of academic institutions, professional societies, and legal associations.  Many of his papers and articles have more recently appeared as part of the curriculum in academic and professional training programs.

In each of these works, Waites explored varied applications of jury research findings to the practice of law and trial advocacy in the courtroom.  These papers and articles have been published by national, state, and local bar associations and attorney professional groups, such as the American Bar Association, the Defense Research Institute, American Health Lawyers Association, Federation of Defense and Corporate Counsel, and many other professional organizations engaged in professional education of courtroom practitioners.

In 2003, editors and publishers with American Lawyer Media invited Waites to author a book for trial attorneys and corporate representatives who manage litigation which would merge practically useful knowledge from peer-reviewed social science and psychology research with state-of-the-art trial advocacy practice.  This book, entitled Courtroom Psychology and Trial Advocacy, was released in 2004.

After 2004, Waites published many professional papers and articles exploring varied applications of jury research findings to the practice of law and trial advocacy in the courtroom. In 2010, Waites and James E. Lawrence, Director of the Blakely Advocacy Institute at University of Houston Law Center and senior trial consultant with The Advocates, published the first known work examining the application of social science research techniques for use in international arbitration advocacy.  (Chapter 4: "Psychological Dynamics in International Arbitration Advocacy" in The Art of Advocacy in International Arbitration, 2nd edition, authored by Doak Bishop and Edward G. Kehoe and published by Juris Publishing, 2010). In this work, Waites and Lawrence examine the merger of experimental social science research techniques used widely in the United States with multi-culturalism for use in the development of persuasive advocacy in the international arbitration context.

Waites’ published articles and presentations continue to be used by academic, legal, and professional organizations as part of their continuing education programs for professionals who practice in the courtroom.  e.g. Seak Expert Witness Conference Crittenden Medical Insurance Conference - 2007, Defense Research Institute – Medical and Health Care Law Conference.

Awards and affiliations
As a prominent board certified trial attorney and social psychologist, Waites is the recipient of numerous professional awards and honors. He is a member of the American Bar Association, American Psychological Association, American Psychology - Law Society, American Society of Trial Consultants, Defense Research Institute, National Institute of Trial Advocacy, and the State Bar of Texas. He is board certified as a civil trial attorney by the Texas Board of Legal Specialization and has received a personal 'AV" rating by Martindale Hubbell.

Background and education
He conducted his undergraduate and early graduate work in social science and psychology at the University of West Georgia in Carrollton, Georgia.  The psychology department at the university is believed to be one of only two university psychology departments in the United States that focus on the study of humanistic psychology.

Professional
He obtained his law degree (J.D.) from the University of Houston Law Center and afterwards practiced law as a trial attorney for 13 years.  During this time, Waites represented hundreds of individuals and corporations in litigation matters, including more than 70 jury trials. After a lengthy examination and review process stipulated by the Supreme Court of Texas, he became board certified as a civil trial attorney. At about the same time, Waites continued his education in psychology and received his doctorate (Ph.D.) (summa cum laude) in psychology from Walden University in Minneapolis, Minnesota.

Waites is one of the founders of Advocacy Sciences, Inc. (The Advocates), the largest jury and trial consulting firm in the United States. The Advocates has 23 professional trial consultants and offices in 17 major cities throughout the nation. He serves as The Advocates' CEO/Chief Trial Psychologist.

See also
 Jury research
 Legal psychology
 Scientific jury selection

References

 Abbott, Walter F. and Batt, John, A Handbook of Jury Research, Published by the American Law Institute - American Bar Association (1999), 798 pp.
 Ballesteros, Sydney G. "Don't Mess With Texas Voir Dire", 39 Houston L. Rev. 202-241.
 Griffith, James D., Hart, Christian L., Kessler, Jill, and Goodling, Morgan L., Trial consultants: Perceptions of eligible jurors, Consulting Psychology Journal: Practice and Research. 2007 Jun Vol 59(2) 148-153.
 Hans, Valerie P., Vidmar, Neil, and Zeisel, Hans, Judging the Jury, Published by Basic Books (2001), 286 pp.
 Jeffreys, B., "Enron Defendant Worked Alongside Attorneys to Win Acquittal", (Texas Lawyer, Nov. 18, 2004).
 Lieberman, Joel D. and Sales, Bruce D. "Additional trial consulting techniques that aid jury selection" in Scientific Jury Selection. (pp. 167–185). Washington, DC, US: American Psychological Association (2007) ix, 261 pp.
 Posey, Amy J. and Wrightsman, Lawrence S., Trial consulting, American Psychology-Law Society Series. New York, NY, US: Oxford University Press (2005), 272 pp.
 Strier, Franklin, "Whither trial consulting? Issues and projections": Erratum. Law and Human Behavior. 1999 Apr Vol 23(2), 269 (original article: Law and Human Behavior. 1999 Feb Vol 23(1) 93-115.
 Vidmar, Neil and Hans, Valerie P., American Juries, Published by Prometheus Books (2007), 428 pp.
 Waites, Richard C. and Giles, David A., "Are Jurors Equipped to Decide the Outcome of Complex Cases?", 29 Am. J. Trial Advoc. 19 (2005).
 Waites, Richard C. and Lawrence, James E., Chapter 4: "Psychological Dynamics in International Arbitration Advocacy" in The Art of Advocacy in International Arbitration, 2nd edition, Doak Bishop and Edward G. Kehoe Editors, Published by Juris Publishing (2010), 668 pp.
 Waites, Richard C., Courtroom Psychology and Trial Advocacy, Published by American Lawyer Media (2004), 625 pp.
 Waites, Richard C., "Juror Perceptions About Lawsuits and Tort Reform", 5 The Jury Expert, 1 (Published by the American Society of Trial Consultants)(2007).
 Waites, Richard C., "Is Restricting Voir Dire Just Good Court Management or Infringement of Due Process?, THE LEGAL INTELLIGENCER, July 11, 2000, WL 7/11/2000 TLI 7, at 1.

External links
 American Bar Association
 American Psychological Association
 American Psychology - Law Society
 American Society of Trial Consultants
 The Advocates (Advocacy Sciences, Inc.)

American lawyers
American social psychologists
Living people
University of Houston Law Center alumni
1951 births
American male writers